MDCH may refer to:
 Maryland Digital Cultural Heritage
 Michigan Department of Community Health 
 (acyl-carrier-protein) S-malonyltransferase, an enzyme